Ramecourt is the name of two communes in France:
 Ramecourt, Pas-de-Calais
 Ramecourt, Vosges